or Akao Mimisaka no Kami Kiyotsuna was a Japanese samurai of the late Sengoku period, a senior retainer of the Azai clan of Ōmi Province.

Kiyotsuna served three generations of the Azai lords: Sukemasa, Hisamasa, and Nagamasa. As a mark of the Azai family's deep trust of Akao, he was allowed to maintain a residence within Odani Castle. He is noted for his role in the ascendancy of Nagamasa by forcing Hisamasa into retirement in 1560.

In 1573, Kiyotsuna was imprisoned after the fall of Odani Castle, and beheaded by Nobunaga. However, Nobunaga spared the life of Kiyotsuna's son, Akao Kiyofuyu.

Notes

Samurai
1514 births
1573 deaths